Benjamin Gary Thorne (born 19 March 1993 in Kitimat) is a Canadian athlete specialising in the race walking. He represented his country in the 20 kilometres at the 2013 World Championships finishing twentieth.  Two years later he won the bronze medal.

Thorne won the NAIA 20-kilometre race walk event in 2012 and 2015.

In July 2016, he was named to Canada's Olympic team.

Competition record

Personal bests
10,000 metres walk – 40:26.0 (Calgary 2012)
10 kilometres walk – 42:34 (Saransk 2012)
20 kilometres walk – 1:19:55 (Rome 2016)

References

1993 births
Living people
Canadian male racewalkers
University of British Columbia alumni
World Athletics Championships athletes for Canada
World Athletics Championships medalists
Athletes (track and field) at the 2016 Summer Olympics
Olympic track and field athletes of Canada
Universiade medalists in athletics (track and field)
Athletes (track and field) at the 2018 Commonwealth Games
Universiade silver medalists for Canada
Medalists at the 2015 Summer Universiade
Medalists at the 2013 Summer Universiade
Commonwealth Games competitors for Canada
People from Kitimat